Camp John Hay is a mixed-used development which serves as a tourist destination and forest watershed reservation in Baguio, Philippines which was formerly a military base of the United States Armed Forces.

History

The United States 48th Infantry Unit under Captain Robert Rudd established Hill Station in the current site of Camp John Hay in 1900 during the Philippine-American war. The site is referred to the locals, the Ibalois, as "Kafagway" and is owned by Ibaloi leader Mateo Cariño.  of the land was then designated as "Camp John Hay", a military reservation for American soldiers, in October 1903 when US President Theodore Roosevelt signed a presidential order. American military personnel were given a place to refuge from the relative hotter temperature of the lowlands.

In December 1941, Japanese warplanes dropped 72 bombs over the main gate of the camp during the onset of World War II in the Philippines. Camp John Hay served as an internment camp of the Imperial Japanese forces as well as the headquarters of General Tomoyuki Yamashita during the Japanese occupation period. When the Japanese forces in the archipelago capitulated, Yamashita surrendered to the Allied forces at Camp John Hay, specifically at the High Commissioner's residence which was later renamed as the Ambassador's Residence.

After the war, Camp John Hay was converted into John Hay Air Base in 1955 and remained under the control of the Americans until it was officially turned over the Philippine government in 1991. The former military installation was made into a human resource development hub, and forest watershed reservation. The site became a tourist attraction.

Features

Historic buildings and structures
The Bell House, a historic structure named after Major General Franklin Bell is situated at the camp's Historical Core. Besides the house is the Bell Amphitheater which was designed by Bell himself.

Gardens
Camp John Hay's history is featured through markers installed at the History Trail and Secret Garden. The Cemetery of Negativism nearby or the Lost Cemetery is a small area within Camp John Hay. The "cemetery" established by then-commanding general of the John Hay Air Station, John Hightower in the early 1980s. It serves a symbolic burial site for negativism. The Amphiteather near Bell House also hosts a gazebo which is encircled by a multi-terraced flower garden.

Others
Manor Hotel and Forest Lodge are the two hotels operated by the management of Camp John Hay and are situated within the area.

References

Parks in Baguio
Birdwatching sites in the Philippines
Tourist attractions in Baguio